SM Prime Holdings, Inc. (SMPH) is a Filipino integrated property developer and a public subsidiary of SM Investments Corporation. It was incorporated on January 6, 1994, to develop, conduct, operate, and maintain the SM commercial shopping centers and all businesses related thereto, such as the lease of commercial spaces within the compound of shopping centers. It went public on July 5, 1994, and subsequently grew to become the largest company listed on the Philippine Stock Exchange in terms of revenue. The company's main sources of revenues primarily include rental income from mall and food courts, as well as from cinema ticket sales and amusement income.

History
The roots of SM date back to the 1950s when entrepreneur Henry Sy, Sr. established a shoe store at Carriedo Street in Quiapo, Manila. His store was established as ShoeMart, which was originally located at Carlos Palanca Sr. Street. His aggressive and adamant strategy helped him gain large profits within a few years and he later expanded his business to become a fully functioning department store named ShoeMart, which specializes in the sale of shoes, the sector of which the store originally was. ShoeMart was abbreviated into SM, the name which became commonly known by the locals. The abbreviation SM has become an orphan initialism. The first ShoeMart outlet was abandoned and the department store moved to a new site along the nearby Carriedo Street. The old site was demolished in 1982 and was turned into its Clearance Outlet.

The first SM Mall, the SM North EDSA, was opened in 1985. Followed by the establishment of a second mall, the SM Centerpoint, in 1990. Since then, the company has expanded by establishing malls nationwide.

On May 17, 2013, SM opened the SM Aura Premier. The same year, the company announced a merger with SM Land, which owns SM Development and Commercial Properties Group. As a result, upon approval by Securities and Exchange Commission, SM Prime is one of the largest property companies in the Southeast Asia region, competing with Gokongwei-led Robinsons Land (which owns Robinsons Malls and Tan-led Megaworld Corporation).

Subsidiaries

SM Supermalls

SM Supermalls is a chain of shopping malls with over 60 malls in the Philippines, and seven in China. According to the company, the malls attract an average foot traffic of 3.5 million daily and has over 5,000 tenant partners.

SM Development Corporation

SM Development Corporation (SMDC) is a wholly owned subsidiary and the real estate arm of SMPH. SM Development Corporation commits itself to providing access to luxurious urban living through vertical villages perfectly integrated with a commercial retail environment, giving its residents access to a truly cosmopolitan lifestyle.

Properties of SM Development Corporation are strategically situated in key areas across Metro Manila specifically the Central Business Districts of Mall of Asia Complex, Makati, Ortigas, Taguig, Quezon City, Manila, Pasay, Parañaque and Las Piñas.

They can also be easily accessed from neighboring provinces like Cavite, Bulacan, Pampanga, Iloilo and Bacolod.

Back in 2020, SMDC bagged the most-coveted Best Developer of the Year award in the annual PropertyGuru Asia Property Awards alongside other recognitions:

See also

SM Supermalls
SM Store
List of shopping malls in the Philippines
List of largest shopping malls in the Philippines

References

Real estate companies established in 1958
Real estate companies of the Philippines
Shopping center management firms
 
Companies listed on the Philippine Stock Exchange
Companies based in Pasay
Philippine companies established in 1958